Cher's 2nd constituency is one of three French legislative constituencies in the department of Cher. It is currently represented by Nicolas Sansu of the Communist Party (PCF).

Historic representation

Elections

2022 

 
 
 
 
 
|-
| colspan="8" bgcolor="#E9E9E9"|
|-

2017

2012 

Agnès Sinsoulier-Bigot, the socialist party candidate withdrew from the election before the second round.

2007

 
 
 
 
 
 
 
|-
| colspan="8" bgcolor="#E9E9E9"|
|-

2002

 
 
 
 
 
 
 
 
|-
| colspan="8" bgcolor="#E9E9E9"|
|-

1997

References

External links 
Results of legislative elections from 2002 to 2017 by constituency (Ministry of the Interior) 
Results of legislative elections from 1958 to 2012 by constituency (CDSP Sciences Po) 
Results of elections from 1958 to present by constituency (data.gouv.fr) 

2